Madea's Big Happy Family is a 2011 American comedy-drama film based on Tyler Perry's 2010 play of the same name. It is the 11th film in the Tyler Perry film franchise and the sixth in the Madea cinematic universe. Tyler Perry reprised Madea and Joe, and the other cast members include Loretta Devine, Shad "Bow Wow" Moss, David Mann, Cassi Davis, Tamela Mann, Lauren London, Isaiah Mustafa, Natalie Desselle, Rodney Perry, and Shannon Kane. It tells the story of Madea finding out that her niece is dying from cancer. Madea gathers her niece's children and their family members together to deal with the news while contending with the different issues between them.

Madea's Big Happy Family received generally mixed reviews from critics, but it was a box office success, grossing $54.2 million worldwide against a $25 million budget.

Plot
When Madea’s niece, Shirley (Loretta Devine), visits Dr. Evans (Philip Anthony-Rodriguez) with Aunt Bam (Cassi Davis), she discovers her cancer has gotten worse and she may only have a few weeks to live. She invites her children to dinner to tell them all at the same time. Cora Simmons (Tamela Mann) and her father Leroy Brown (David Mann) are also at the hospital where a colonoscopy on Mr. Brown shows a growth that needs to be removed surgically. Meanwhile, Madea (Tyler Perry) furiously and violently drives her car through a restaurant named Snax because the manager, Sabrina (Teyana Taylor) had delayed taking her order until after the restaurant had stopped serving breakfast for the day. Sabrina had been preoccupied with a phone call and had been very rude to Madea when she called her out on it.

When Shirley's children, Byron (Shad "Bow Wow" Moss) who is on probation for selling drugs and is in a relationship with a selfish, gold-digging girlfriend, Renee (Lauren London) and has a son from his previous relationship , Tammy (Natalie Desselle-Reid) who has martial issues with her husband, Harold (Rodney Perry) and their disrespectful kids, and Kimberly (Shannon Kane) who has anger issues and ill-treats her husband Calvin Isaiah Mustafa, her son, C.J. and her family, arrive for dinner, they end up having various arguments amongst themselves and their partners. Byron's ex-girlfriend and mother of his child, Sabrina, arrives, calling Byron a "drug dealer" due to him having been one in the past before being caught and incarcerated. She also lies excessively, uses her son's child support money and supplies for herself, and tries to goad Byron back into selling drugs so she can get more money for herself in the process. Moreover, she also turns out to be the manager of Snax. Aunt Bam goes to Madea's house to ask to help Shirley and she agrees. Later Byron and Renee sneak into Shirley's house and is arrested by the police for failing to pay child support. Shirley goes to Kimberley's house to help her bail Bryon out, but Kimberley refuses but Calvin volunteers to help Shirley which angers Kimberley. The next day, Calvin bails out Byron, the arrest causes Byron to lose his job at the warehouse store. During the day, Madea gathers Shirley's kids to go over to their mother's house for another dinner and also disciplines Tammy's kids. Later that night, they have dinner as a family and Sabrina leaves the baby with Byron and Kimberley arrives late for dinner and an argument ensues causing Tammy to reveal that Kimberley got pregnant at 13 and had Shirley raising the child for her. This revelation causes Kimberley leave early with Calvin following her. Curiously, Byron asks where is the child in which Tammy reveals that Kimberley is Byron's mother. This angers Byron that his family kept this secret and also leaves with Shirley chasing after him. An argument between Harold and Tammy with him banging the table and demanding that Tammy starts respecting him as earlier advised by Madea  and she apologizes. Aftermath, Byron goes back to selling drugs, Calvin leaves Kimberley and takes C.J. with him, Harold and Tammy's relationship and their kids seem to be improving. Cora discovers that Mr. Brown is not her biological father and confronts Madea about it in which she is convinced that Mr. Brown is her father. With all of the drama and arguing Shirley does not get the chance to tell the family about her cancer. 

Over time, Shirley's condition worsens greatly, and she is taken to the hospital and reveals to her children expect Kimberley who is not present that she has cancer and tells her family that she loves them and later dies. Kimberley arrives late and is told by Calvin that Shirley had died and is overcome by grief and regret that she didn't treat her mother right during her last days. Days later, they have a funeral service for their mother and is buried. 

At the reception that followed, Madea confronts the family that Shirley was peaceful woman, she tells Sabrina move on with her life and leave Byron alone. Madea confronts Byron that he should start taking care of his son and must go legit and get a job so he can provide for his child and warns him if he continues selling drugs, it will lead him to two places, it is either he will end up dead or he will end up back in prison and as soon as that happens, Renee "will be sold to the highest bidder", meaning she will leave Byron for somebody better than him. Madea then tells Sabrina and Byron that they need to start working together on raising their child. She then reveals that Kimberly was raped by her paternal uncle when she was 12, resulting her having a baby at 13 (meaning that Byron was conceived through rape). That explains why she has so much bitterness and anger towards her family, Calvin, C.J. and herself. Madea tells Kimberley that she has to forgive her uncle so she can find peace and that she needs to start treating her husband and son better. Kimberley goings upstairs and apologises to Calvin and agrees to get psychological help to fix their marriage and they make peace. Byron breaks up with Renee because of her selfish, gold-digging ways, Renee insults him and leaves. Later, Madea, Mr. Brown, and Cora appear on Maury to find out if Mr. Brown is in fact Cora's father. Madea insists that he is, but it turns out he is not after a brief argument on said issue. This shocks Madea, who runs off-stage, sobbing hysterically with Joe laughing at her while watching her on TV.

Cast
 Tyler Perry as:
 Mabel "Madea" Simmons, Shirley’s tough aunt and grandaunt of Shirley’s children.
 Joe Simmons, the brother of Madea
Loretta Devine as Shirley, the niece of Madea and Aunt Bam
Shad "Bow Wow" Moss as Byron, an, ex con, and the son of Shirley and a grandnephew of Madea and Aunt Bam, later revealed to be her grandson (as well as Madea and Aunt Bam’s great-grandnephew) and Kimberly’s son from being raped by her uncle
 Tamela Mann as Cora Brown, the daughter of Madea
 David Mann as Leroy Brown, the supposed father of Cora Simmons
 Cassi Davis as Aunt Bam, the cousin of Madea and the aunt of Shirley
 Lauren London as Renee, the gold-digging girlfriend of Byron
 Shannon Kane as Kimberly, a real estate agent, the daughter of Shirley, a grandniece of Madea and Aunt Bam, and the biological mother of Byron upon being raped by her uncle
 Isaiah Mustafa as Calvin, the husband of Kimberly
 Natalie Desselle-Reid as Tammy, the daughter of Shirley, a grandniece of Madea and Aunt Bam, and co-owner of an auto-repair garage
 Rodney Perry as Harold, the husband of Tammy and co-owner of an auto-repair garage
 Steven Wash Jr. as H.J., the elder son of Tammy and Harold, as well as a grandson of Shirley, and a great-grandnephew of Madea and Aunt Bam
 Nicholas Milton as Will, the younger son of Tammy and Harold, as well as a grandson of Shirley, and a great-grandnephew of Madea and Aunt Bam
 Benjamin 'LB' Aiken as C.J., the son of Kimberly and Calvin, as well as the grandson of Shirley, and a great-grandnephew of Madea and Aunt Bam
 Teyana Taylor as Sabrina, the nagging ex-girlfriend of Byron and manager of Snax
 Philip Anthony-Rodriguez as Dr. Evans, a doctor who oversees the medical treatments of Shirley and Mr. Brown
 Palmer Williams Jr. as Mr. Mills, the manager of Lam Co. Imports
 Ron Grant as Pastor Jackson, a pastor who oversees Shirley's funeral
 Chandra Currelley as Sister Laura; the actress also portrayed Shirley in the original stage play.
 Maury Povich as Himself, he hears the different cases of Sabrina and Cora

Release

Box office
Madea's Big Happy Family was released on April 22, 2011. It pulled in $25,068,677 on its opening weekend, ranking #2 at the box office behind Rio. By the end of its run, the $25 million film grossed $53,345,287 in the United States.

Critical reception
The film has received mixed reviews from critics. Based on 42 reviews collected by Rotten Tomatoes, the film has an approval rating of 38% with an average rating of 4.60/10. Metacritic gave the film an average rating of 45 based on 15 reviews, indicating "mixed or average reviews". Audiences polled by CinemaScore gave the film an A grade.

Home media
Madea's Big Happy Family was released on DVD and Blu-ray on August 30, 2011. The DVD features four featurettes: "By-reen: The Baby Mama from Hell", "Ties That Bind", "Madea's Family Tree", and "Brown Calls Maury". The Blu-ray contains these features as well as a digital copy.

See also
 List of black films of the 2010s

References

External links
 
 
 
 

2011 films
2011 romantic comedy-drama films
American romantic comedy-drama films
Films directed by Tyler Perry
African-American films
American films based on plays
Films shot in Georgia (U.S. state)
Lionsgate films
Films scored by Aaron Zigman
Films with screenplays by Tyler Perry
2011 comedy films
2011 drama films
Films about dysfunctional families
2010s English-language films
2010s American films